Commonplace  may refer to:

Commonplace book
Literary topos, the concept in rhetoric based on "commonplaces" or standard topics
The everyday life of commoners
Commonplace (album), a 2004 album by Every Little Thing